The Queens Hotel is located in Perth, Perth and Kinross, Scotland. Queen Victoria was a regular visitor to that hotel.

Named Gillan's Queen's Hotel in the late 18th and early 19th centuries, it had an attached bar on its northern side. In 1889, it was one of four Perth public houses fined for breaching the Forbes McKenzie Act by not enforcing closing time on a Tuesday night. The legislation was passed in 1853 to regulate pubs in Scotland.

Today's incarnation is owned by Best Western. The buildings attached to the northern side of the original hotel, and part of Pomarium Street to the rear, were demolished in the 1950s to make way for Perth bus station.

In 1918, during the latter stages of World War I, the building was used as the headquarters for the district directorate of the Ministry of Labour for Perthshire and surrounding counties. The department's charge was "the resettlement in civil life of officers and men of like educational qualifications".

References

External links 

 

Buildings and structures in Perth, Scotland
Hotels in Perth and Kinross
19th-century establishments in Scotland